Ahmed Hammoudan (born 12 April 1991 in Chefchaouen) is a Moroccan player who plays for AS FAR as a winger.

Career statistics

Club

Honours

Club
Ittihad Tanger
Botola: 2017–18
Botola 2: 2014–15

International
Moroccan Local
African Nations Championship: 2018

Individual
Botola Best Promising Player of the Season: 2016–17.
Botola Best Player of the Season: 2017–18.

References

1991 births
Living people
People from Chefchaouen
Moroccan footballers
Moroccan expatriate footballers
Association football wingers
Ittihad Tanger players
Al-Raed FC players
Al-Khor SC players
Al-Sailiya SC players
Umm Salal SC players
Botola players
Saudi Professional League players
Qatar Stars League players
Expatriate footballers in Saudi Arabia
Expatriate footballers in Qatar
Moroccan expatriate sportspeople in Saudi Arabia
Moroccan expatriate sportspeople in Qatar
2018 African Nations Championship players
Morocco A' international footballers